Mauro Fernandes da Silva (born 3 August 1953), known as Mauro Fernandes, is a Brazilian retired footballer who played as a forward, and is a current manager.

Career
Born in Sete Lagoas, Minas Gerais, Mauro Fernandes started his career with Corinthians in 1970. After representing other clubs in the São Paulo state, he moved to Mexico and Greece before returning and finishing his playing career with CSA, Treze and Campinense.

Mauro Fernandes started his managerial career in 1984, with Auto Esporte. In 1986 he moved to Série A club Botafogo-PB, winning two Campeonato Paraibano titles during his tenure.

Mauro Fernandes subsequently managed ABC (two stints), CSA, Sergipe, Náutico (three stints), Goiás, Atlético Goianiense (three stints), Sport (two stints), Coritiba, Botafogo, Gama (two stints), Matonense, América Mineiro (three stints), CRB, Londrina, Brasiliense (two stints), Fortaleza, Ceilândia (two stints), Bahia, Vitória (two stints), Santa Cruz, Criciúma, Villa Nova, Grêmio Barueri and Rio Verde before deciding to retire from football. On 3 December 2014, however, he stepped down from retirement to take over Caldas Novas Atlético Clube, but his reign only lasted three months.

On 21 February 2017, after nearly two years without a club, Mauro Fernandes was named manager of Treze. On 30 May, he replaced Estevam Soares at Portuguesa.

Honours

Manager
Botafogo-PB
Campeonato Paraibano: 1986, 1988

ABC
Campeonato Potiguar: 1990

CSA
Campeonato Alagoano: 1991

Sergipe
Campeonato Sergipano: 1993, 1994, 1995

Goiás
Campeonato Goiano: 1996, 1997

Sport
Campeonato Pernambucano: 1998

Brasiliense
Campeonato Brasiliense: 2004

Atlético Goianiense
Campeonato Brasileiro Série C: 2008

References

External links
Futebol de Goyaz profile 

1953 births
Living people
Sportspeople from Minas Gerais
Brazilian footballers
Brazilian football managers
Campeonato Brasileiro Série A managers
Campeonato Brasileiro Série B managers
Campeonato Brasileiro Série C managers
Campeonato Brasileiro Série D managers
Association football forwards
Sport Club Corinthians Paulista players
Centro Sportivo Alagoano players
Treze Futebol Clube players
Campinense Clube players
Botafogo Futebol Clube (PB) managers
ABC Futebol Clube managers
Centro Sportivo Alagoano managers
Club Sportivo Sergipe managers
Clube Náutico Capibaribe managers
Goiás Esporte Clube managers
Atlético Clube Goianiense managers
Sport Club do Recife managers
Coritiba Foot Ball Club managers
Botafogo de Futebol e Regatas managers
Sociedade Esportiva do Gama managers
Sociedade Esportiva Matonense managers
Clube de Regatas Brasil managers
América Futebol Clube (MG) managers
Londrina Esporte Clube managers
Brasiliense Futebol Clube managers
Fortaleza Esporte Clube managers
Ceilândia Esporte Clube managers
Esporte Clube Bahia managers
Esporte Clube Vitória managers
Santa Cruz Futebol Clube managers
Criciúma Esporte Clube managers
Villa Nova Atlético Clube managers
Grêmio Barueri Futebol managers
Esporte Clube Rio Verde managers
Treze Futebol Clube managers
Associação Portuguesa de Desportos managers
Central Sport Club managers
Associação Atlética Caldense managers